The Lands Tribunal was a tribunal in the United Kingdom created by the Lands Tribunal Act 1949 that had jurisdiction in England and Wales and Northern Ireland, although in the Northern Ireland context the term Lands Tribunal normally refers to a different body, the Lands Tribunal for Northern Ireland. The Lands Tribunal was unusual in having both first instance and appellate jurisdiction. The functions of the Lands Tribunal were transferred to the Upper Tribunal in June 2009 by the Transfer of Tribunal Functions (Lands Tribunal and Miscellaneous Amendments) Order 2009.

Jurisdiction 
The Lands Tribunal was established to replace the panel of official arbitrators which had previously determined disputes as to compensation payable to the owners and occupiers of land affected by compulsory purchase. It additionally acted as the appellate tribunal hearing rating appeals from the valuation tribunals and had jurisdiction in relation to ordering the discharge or modification of restrictive covenants affecting land, under section 84 of the Law of Property Act 1925.

A major further jurisdiction was conferred under the Leasehold Reform Act 1967 which conferred upon the long leaseholders of lower value houses in England the right to acquire their freeholds, on terms laid out by statute. Disputes as to quantum were originally decided by the Lands Tribunal. In 1980 the original jurisdiction was transferred to the newly created leasehold valuation tribunals with the Lands Tribunal becoming the appellate tribunal on such disputes.

The Lands Tribunal also had a general appellate jurisdiction in relation to decisions of the leasehold valuation tribunals and residential property tribunals.

Appeals from the Lands Tribunal were heard in the Court of Appeal.

Composition 
The President of the Lands Tribunal had to be a solicitor or barrister, and the Members either solicitors, barristers, or persons experienced in the valuation of land.

See also 
 Lands Tribunal for Scotland

References

External links
 the Lands Tribunal home page

English property law
Former courts and tribunals in the United Kingdom
1949 establishments in the United Kingdom
2010 disestablishments in the United Kingdom
Courts and tribunals established in 1949
Courts and tribunals disestablished in 2010